A-Pucikwar may refer to:
the A-Pucikwar people
the A-Pucikwar language